Misterr Drake's Duck is a 1951 British science-fiction comedy film directed by Val Guest and starring Douglas Fairbanks Jr., Yolande Donlan, Jon Pertwee, Wilfrid Hyde-White and Reginald Beckwith. The screenplay concerns a farmer who discovers that one of his ducks has started laying radioactive eggs.

Plot
Mr. Drake inherits Green Acres Farm in Sussex, in the English countryside, where he moves with his new American bride Penny. Because of a misunderstanding, Penny unexpectedly finds that she owns 60 ducks. She is astonished when one of the ducks begins laying radioactive eggs. As the news spreads, the Drakes come under siege by the army. Green Acres Farm is designated a prohibited area, and of all its inhabitants and visitors are made prisoners. The military launches Operation Chickweed to snatch the radioactive duck.

Cast
 Douglas Fairbanks Jr. as Donald Drake
 Yolande Donlan as Penny Drake
 Jon Pertwee as Reuben
 Wilfrid Hyde-White as Mr May
 Reginald Beckwith as Mr Boothby
 Howard Marion-Crawford as Major Travers
 Peter Butterworth as Higgins
 A. E. Matthews as Brigadier Matthews
 Tom Gill as Captain White
 John Boxer as Sergeant
 Ballard Berkeley as Major Deans
 Roger Maxwell as Colonel Maitland
 Ben Williams as Auctioneer

Reception
Upon the film's American release, A. H. Weiler of The New York Times wrote: "Mister Drake's Duck is responsible for some chuckles, a few good-natured gibes at the British armed services and civil servants and the international race for atomic supremacy. ... They are, of course, laboring one joke, but do come up with enough laughs to make Mister Drake's Duck a pleasant if slight lampoon."

References

External links
 

1951 films
1950s science fiction comedy films
British science fiction comedy films
1950s English-language films
Films directed by Val Guest
1951 comedy films
British black-and-white films
1950s British films